Chotilsko is a municipality and village in Příbram District in the Central Bohemian Region of the Czech Republic. It has about 600 inhabitants.

Administrative parts
Villages and hamlets of Cholín-Boubovny, Hněvšín, Knihy, Kobylníky, Křeničná, Lipí, Mokrsko, Prostřední Lhota, Sejcká Lhota, Smilovice, Záborná Lhota and Živohošť are administrative parts of Chotilsko.

References

Villages in Příbram District